Cocker is the tenth studio album by Joe Cocker, released in April 1986, his second on Capitol label. It features hit singles "You Can Leave Your Hat On" and "Don't You Love Me Anymore", the first made popular after its use in the famous striptease scene in the film 9½ Weeks. Released as a single, Cocker's version of the song peaked at No. 35 on Billboard Hot Mainstream Rock Tracks. The album also features rendition of Marvin Gaye's "Inner City Blues", a Motown legend's classic lament to urban decay.

Where Civilized Man, Cocker's previous album, had two producers, Cocker had five. Also, the recording sessions took place in several studios in London, Memphis, Los Angeles and New York. The reason for this was Capitol trying out on Joe Cocker a formula that had brought success for Tina Turner. The album also featured, for the first time since 1976's Stingray, Cocker's touring band, who played on five tracks.

The release of Cocker was preceded by a single "Shelter Me", a powerful opener from the album, featuring rousing performances from guitarist Cliff Goodwin and saxophonist Mel Collins.

The album is dedicated to Joe Cocker's mother, Marjorie (Madge) Cocker, who died during the time period of the recording sessions.

Track listing
 "Shelter Me" (Nick DiStefano) – 5:36
 "A to Z" (Tom Kimmel) – 4:21
 "Don't You Love Me Anymore" (Albert Hammond, Diane Warren) – 5:25
 "Living Without Your Love" (Michael Bolton, Doug James) – 4:09
 "Don't Drink The Water" (Richard Feldman, Pat Robinson) – 3:25
 "You Can Leave Your Hat On" (Randy Newman) – 4:14	
 "Heart of the Matter" (Ronald Miller, Billy Aerts) – 4:20	
 "Inner City Blues" (Marvin Gaye, James Nyx Jr.) – 5:51	
 "Love Is on a Fade" (Stephen Allen Davis, Dennis Morgan) – 4:04	
 "Heaven" (Terry Manning) – 4:32

Sessions outtake
 "Tell Me There's A Way" (Roy Freeland, Beppe Cantarelli) – 4:04

Personnel 

 Joe Cocker – lead vocals
 Larry Marshall – keyboards (1, 2), synthesizers (8-10), organ (10)
 Carl Marsh – Fairlight programming (1, 2, 8-10)
 Howie Hersh – keyboards (2), acoustic piano (8-10)
 Jeff Lorber – keyboards (3)
 Michael Moran – keyboards (4), bass (4, 7)
 Jeff Bova – keyboards (5)
 Arthur Barrow – synthesizers (6), bass (6)
 Michael Boddicker – keyboards (7)
 Cliff Goodwin – guitar (1, 2, 5, 7-10)
 Neal Schon – guitar (3)
 Dann Huff – guitar (4), additional guitar (7)
 Eddie Martinez – guitar (5)
 Richie Zito – guitar (6)
 Vito Sanfilippo – bass (1, 2, 8-10)
 Randy Jackson – bass (3)
 Bernard Edwards – bass (5)
 Eric Parker – drums (1, 2, 4, 7-10)
 Anton Fig – drums (5)
 Mike Baird – drums (6)
 Mel Collins – saxophone (1, 2, 8)
 Joel Peskin – saxophone (6)
 Andrew Love – saxophone (10)
 Dick Hyde – trombone (6)
 Steve Madaio – trumpet (6)
 Bob Ezrin – arrangements (3)
 Maxine Green – backing vocals (2, 4-7, 9, 10)
 Elesecia Wright – backing vocals (2, 4, 5, 7, 9, 10)
 Albert Hammond – backing vocals (3)
 Leslie Smith – backing vocals (3)
 Joe Turano – backing vocals (3)
 Diane Warren – backing vocals (3)
 Curtis King – backing vocals (5)
 Julia Tillman Waters – backing vocals (6)
 Maxine Waters – backing vocals (6)

Production 
 Producers – Terry Manning (Tracks 1, 2, 8, 9 & 10, and "Tell Me There's a Way"); Albert Hammond and Diane Warren (Track 3); Ron Nevison (Tracks 4 & 7); Bernard Edwards (Track 5); Richie Zito (Track 6).
 Engineers – Terry Manning (Tracks 1, 2, 8, 9 & 10); Guy Roche (Track 3); Ron Nevison (Tracks 4 & 7); Josh Abbey and Jason Corsaro (Track 5); Brian Reeves (Track 6).
 Assistant Engineers – Stuart Barry, Kim Jenkins, Paul Mortimer and Patrick Stanley (Tracks 1, 2, 8, 9 & 10); Mike Clink and Matt Howe (Tracks 4 & 7); Jon Goldberger (Track 5).
 Mixing – Terry Manning (Tracks 1, 2, 8, 9 & 10); Bob Ezrin and Paul Lani (Track 3); 
 Tracks 1, 2 & 8-10 recorded at Ardent Studios (Memphis, TN), Abbey Road Studios and The Workhouse (London, UK); Track 3 recorded at Criterion Studios  (Hollywood, CA); Tracks 4 & 7 recorded at AIR Studios (London, UK) and Record Plant (Los Angeles, CA); Track 5  recorded at The Power Station (New York, NY); Track 6 recorded at Oasis Recording Studios (Universal City, CA) and Ocean Way Recording (Hollywood, CA).
 Art Direction – Roy Kohara
 Design – Peter Shea
 Photography – Peter Ashworth
 Management – Michael Lang at Better Music, Inc.

Chart performance

Certifications

References

1986 albums
Joe Cocker albums
EMI Records albums
Albums produced by Richie Zito
Albums produced by Ron Nevison
Albums produced by Bernard Edwards
Capitol Records albums
Albums recorded at United Western Recorders